The Sons of the Republic of Texas is a lineal association dedicated to perpetuating the memory of the founding families and soldiers of the Republic of Texas. It was founded in 1893.

See also
Daughters of the Republic of Texas

References

External links
Official website

Organizations based in Austin, Texas
Lineage societies
State based fraternal and lineage societies
1893 establishments in the United States